Sinking, also known as doming, dishing or dapping, is a metalworking technique whereby flat sheet metal is formed into a non-flat object by hammering it into a concave indentation. While sinking is a relatively fast method, it results in stretching and therefore thinning the metal, risking failure of the metal if it  is "sunk" too far.

Sinking is used in the manufacture of many items, from jewellery to plate armour.

See also
 Planishing

References 
 Rupert Finegold and William Seitz. Silversmithing. Krause; 1983. 
  Price, Brian R. Techniques of Medieval Armour Reproduction. Boulder, CO: Paladin Press, 2000. 

Metal forming
Jewellery making